Tragic Hero Records is an independent record label founded in Raleigh, North Carolina, in March 2005 to represent the growing metalcore and post-hardcore scene of North Carolina. The label was founded by Tommy LaCombe, David Varnedoe, and Jason Ganthner. Alesana was the first band the label signed. Among Tragic Hero's best-known signees are Motionless in White, who later signed with Fearless Records, and then with Roadrunner Records, Strawberry Girls and A Skylit Drive, who reached No. 64 on the Billboard 200; Alesana, who later signed with Fearless Records, Letlive, who later signed with Epitaph Records, The Afterimage, who broke up and reformed as Brand of Sacrifice, and He Is Legend, who signed with Tragic Hero after several successful full-lengths on other labels.

Current artists  
Dwellings
Set to Stun
Soleo
Girl Cologne

Alumni artists 

 A Skylit Drive
 Akissforjersey
 Alesana (Revival Recordings)
 Aethere (Stay Sick Recordings)
 The Afterimage
 Armor For The Broken
 The Artificials (DIY)
 Avant Garde
 Bad Luck
 Boxbomb
 The Body Rampant
 Brighter Than A Thousand Suns
 Called To Arms
 Chasing Safety (Outerloop Records)
 Confide (band)
 Crossfaith (Razor & Tie)
 The Dead Rabbitts
 Deathblow
 Delusions
 Earthists.
 Eternal Void
 ERRA (UNFD)
 Everyone Dies in Utah
 Eyes Like Diamonds
 Fele Gonzalez 
 The Fight Between Frames
 Finch
 Ghost of a Fallen Age
 Graves of Valor
 Greeley Estates
 He is Legend (Spinefarm Records)
 Invent Animate (UNFD)
 I Set My Friends On Fire
 Illuminate Me
 In Dying Arms
 In Other Words
 It's Like Love
 Iwrestledabearonce (Artery Recordings)
 Kelsey and the Chaos
 Keyes
 Knives Exchanging Hands
 Letlive
 Miracle At St. Anna
 Moments Till Fall
 The Morning Of
 Motionless In White (Roadrunner Records)
 My Hero Is Me
 Nevada Rose
 Nights
 The Northern
 Northern Ghost
 Outlands
 Pathways
 PVRIS (Warner Records)
 Roseview
 Save Us From The Archon
 Scapegoat (Zestone Records)
 Secret Eyes (InVogue Records)
 Set Sights
 Sleep City
 Sirens and Sailors (Artery Recordings)
 Sky Eats Airplane
 Strawberry Girls
 Telescreen
 To Speak of Wolves (Solid State Records)
 This Romantic Tragedy
 Us, From Outside
 Vesuvius
 We Are Defiance
 VALLEYS
 We Are Giant
 Wearing Thin
 Whitney Peyton
 Wrath and Rapture
 Yearling
 The Young Electric
 Your Name In Vain

References

External links 
 

 
American record labels